The women's high jump at the 2008 Olympic Games took place on 21–23 August at the Beijing Olympic Stadium.

Summary
The qualifying standards were 1.95 m (A standard) and 1.91 m (B standard).

The field was narrowed to four athletes by 2.01m. Blanka Vlašić was in the driver's seat, with a perfect round. Vlašić remained in gold medal position by continuing her perfect round to 2.03m. Anna Chicherova moved into silver position with a first attempt clearance as well. Tia Hellebaut took two attempts to get over the height and was in bronze position. Yelena Slesarenko couldn't get over the height and finished in fourth. Vlašić cleared on her second attempt, while Chicherova ended her competition with three straight misses. The bar was moved up to an Olympic record 2.07m, just 2cm below the world record. Neither competitor could get over 2.07m.

Eight years after the competition, samples taken after the event were retested. Chicherova tested positive for dehydrochlormethyltestosterone (turinabol).  The fourth- and fifth-place finishers, Yelena Slesarenko and Vita Palamar also tested positive in the 2016 re-tests.  All three were disqualified from the Olympics, and their results were struck from the record. Medals of other athletes have been reallocated by IAAF.

Records
Prior to this competition, the existing world and Olympic records were as follows.

No new world or Olympic records were set for this event.

Results

Qualifying round
Qualification criteria: 1.96 (Q) or at least 12 best performers (q) advance to the final.

NM - No Mark

Final

NR = National Record / PB = Personal Best / SB = Season Best

References

Athletics at the 2008 Summer Olympics
High jump at the Olympics
2008 in women's athletics
Women's events at the 2008 Summer Olympics